The Battle of Mari, also called the Disaster of Mari, was a battle between the Mamluk Sultanate of Egypt and the Armenians of Cilician Armenia on 24 August 1266.

Battle
The conflict started when the Mamluk Sultan Baybars, seeking to take advantage of the weakened Mongol domination, sent a 30,000 strong army to Cilicia and demanded that Hethum I of Armenia abandon his allegiance to the Mongols, accept himself as a suzerain, and give to the Mamluks the territories and fortresses Hetoum has acquired through his alliance with the Mongols. At the time however, Hetoum I was in Tabriz, having gone to the Mongol court of the Il-Khan in Persia to obtain military support. During his absence, the Mamluks marched on Cilician Armenia, led by Al-Mansur Ali and the Mamluk commander Qalawun.

Hetoum I's two sons, Leo (the future king Leo II) and Thoros, led the defense by strongly manning the fortresses at the entrance of the Cilician territory with a 15,000 strong army. The confrontation took place at Mari, near Darbsakon on 24 August 1266, where the heavily outnumbered Armenians were unable to resist the much larger Mamluk forces. Thoros was killed in battle, and Leo was captured and imprisoned. The Armeno-Mongol son of the Constable Sempad, named Vasil Tatar, was also taken prisoner by the Mamluks and was taken into captivity with Leo, although they are reported to have been treated well.

Aftermath
Following their victory, the Mamluks invaded Cilicia, ravaging the three great cities of the Cilician plain: Mamistra, Adana and Tarsus, as well as the harbour of Ayas. Another group of Mamluks under Mansur took the capital of Sis. The pillage lasted 20 days, during which thousands of Armenians were massacred and 40,000 were taken captive.

When Hetoum I arrived with Mongol troops, the country was already devastated. Hetoum I had to negotiate the return of his son Leo by giving control of Armenia's border fortresses to the Mamluks. In 1269, Hetoum I abdicated in favour of his son, and became a monk, but died a year later. Leo was left in the awkward situation of keeping Cilicia as a subject of the Mongol Empire, while at the same time he was paying tribute to the Mamluks.

Notes

References

Mari
Mari
1266 in Asia
Mari
13th century in the Mamluk Sultanate